The McGill Martlets women's ice hockey team  represented McGill University during the 2011–12 CIS women's ice hockey season. The Martlets were unable to repeat as national champions for the second consecutive season.

Regular season
October 29: Montreal Carabins skater Ariane Barker scored with 71 seconds left to give the squad a 3-2 win at McConnell Arena. Martlets goaltender Charline Labonte took the loss for the Martlets, giving her a 69-2 overall record in her CIS career. It marked the Martlets first loss to a Quebec conference opponent for the first time in 108 games.
October 30: Despite outshooting the Martlets 49-21, the Carleton Lady Ravens were bested by a 3-0 tally. The game was scoreless through two periods, although Ravens skater Claudia Bergeron beat Martlets goaltender Charline Labonte with a shot in the second period. The shot hit the crossbar, but the Martlets registered a trio of goals (including an empty net goal) to win the match. Ann-Sophie Bettez scored the game-winning goal and was recognized as the player of the game for the Martlets, while Ravens goaltender Tamber Tisdale was player of the game for the Ravens.

Schedule

Playoffs 

RSEQ Best-of-three Semifinal Series
Février 22, McGill Martlets 0-2 Ottawa Gee-Gees
Février 24, McGill Martlets 8-0 Ottawa Gee-Gees
Février 26, McGill Martlets 9-1 Ottawa Gee-Gees

RSEQ Best-of-three Championship Series
Février 29, McGill Martlets 5-1 Montreal Carabins
March 2, McGill Martlets 4-0 Montreal Carabins
March 4, ---

CIS National Championship
 March 8 to 11

Current Roster 2011-2012

Staff 2011-2012 

 Councillor-Adviser: Derek Drummond
 Head Coach:  Peter Smith
 Assistant Coach: Amey Doyle
 Assistant Coach: Stewart McCarthey
  Equipment Coordinator: Erika Petosa
 Therapist: Amélie Brais, Stéphanie Antoniades, Micheline Lagace, Lishani Mahendrajah, Julie Mercier
 Team Physician: Dr. Monica Cermignani
  Communications Officer: Earl Zukerman

Awards and honors
Ann-Sophie Bettez, 2012 Brodrick Trophy
Melodie Daoust, 2012 CIS Rookie of the Year

See also
 McGill Martlets ice hockey
 2010–11 McGill Martlets women's hockey season
 2009–10 McGill Martlets women's hockey season
 2008–09 McGill Martlets women's ice hockey season

References

External links
McGill women’s hockey
 The official site of McGill athletics & recreation 
 The official site of CIS Women's Hockey Championship

McGill
MC
Ice hockey teams in Montreal